
Gmina Latowicz is a rural gmina (administrative district) in Mińsk County, Masovian Voivodeship, in east-central Poland.

Villages
Gmina Latowicz contains the villages and settlements of Borówek, Budy Wielgoleskie, Budziska, Chyżyny, Dąbrówka, Dębe Małe, Generałowo, Gołełąki, Kamionka, Latowicz, Oleksianka, Redzyńskie, Stawek, Strachomin, Transbór, Waliska, Wężyczyn and Wielgolas.

Neighbouring gminas
Gmina Latowicz is bordered by the gminas of Borowie, Cegłów, Mrozy, Parysów, Siennica and Wodynie.

References

Polish official population figures 2006

Latowicz
Mińsk County